Rajiv Nandan is an Indian politician. He was elected to the Bihar Legislative Assembly from Gurua constituency in Bihar in the 2015 Bihar Legislative Assembly election as a member of the Bharatiya Janata Party.

References

1966 births
Living people
Bharatiya Janata Party politicians from Bihar
People from Gaya district
Bihar MLAs 2015–2020